Jan Andersson (born 17 March 1947 in Helsingborg, Scania) is a Swedish politician who has been a Member of the European Parliament (MEP) since 1995. He is a member of the Social Democratic Workers' Party of Sweden, which is part of the Party of European Socialists, and is vice-chair of the European Parliament's Committee on Employment and Social Affairs.

He is also a substitute for the Committee on Economic and Monetary Affairs, a substitute for the temporary committee on policy challenges and budgetary means of the enlarged Union 2007–2013, and a member of the delegation for relations with Japan.

Career
 Advanced school-leaving certificate (1967)
 Intermediate-level teacher (1971)
 Teacher in Helsingborg (1972–1988)
 Member of Helsingborg municipal executive board (1982–1988)
 Chairman of Helsingborg Social Welfare Board (1983–1985, 1990)
 Member of the Swedish Parliament (1988–1995)
 Member of the Helsingborg Social Democratic Party executive (1979–1990)
 co-opted member of Skåne Social Democratic Party executive (since 1995)
 Co-opted member of the Social Democratic Party executive committee and party executive (since 2000)
 Member of the European Parliament since 1995

External links
 European Parliament biography link is not active
 

1947 births
Living people
People from Helsingborg
Members of the Riksdag
Swedish Social Democratic Party MEPs
MEPs for Sweden 1995–1999
MEPs for Sweden 1999–2004
MEPs for Sweden 2004–2009